Lugovoye is a rural locality (a selo) in Ilyinsky Selsoviet, Shelabolikhinsky District, Altai Krai, Russia. The population was 73 as of 2013. There are 2 streets.

Geography 
Lugovoye is located 24 km northwest of Shelabolikha (the district's administrative centre) by road. Ilyinka is the nearest rural locality.

References 

Rural localities in Shelabolikhinsky District